
Gmina Skaryszew is an urban-rural gmina (administrative district) in Radom County, Masovian Voivodeship, in east-central Poland.

Villages
Apart from the town of Skaryszew, Gmina Skaryszew contains the villages and settlements of Anielin, Antoniów, Bogusławice, Bujak, Chomętów-Puszcz, Chomętów-Socha, Chomętów-Szczygieł, Edwardów, Gębarzów, Gębarzów-Kolonia, Grabina, Huta Skaryszewska, Janów, Kazimierówka, Kłonowiec-Koracz, Kłonowiec-Kurek, Kobylany, Maków, Maków Nowy, Makowiec, Miasteczko, Modrzejowice, Niwa Odechowska, Nowy Dzierzkówek, Odechów, Odechowiec, Podsuliszka, Sołtyków, Stary Dzierzkówek, Tomaszów, Wilczna, Wólka Twarogowa, Wymysłów and Zalesie.

Neighbouring gminas
Gmina Skaryszew is bordered by the city of Radom and by the gminas of Gózd, Iłża, Kazanów, Kowala, Tczów and Wierzbica.

References
Polish official population figures 2006

Skaryszew
Radom County